State Route 169 (SR 169), also known as Middlebrook Pike, is a west-to-east secondary highway in Knox County in the U.S. state of Tennessee.

The route is 11.7 miles (18.8 km) long.  Its western terminus is in west Knox County at SR 131 (Lovell Road/Ball Camp-Byington Road).  Its eastern terminus is in  Knoxville at SR 62 (Western Avenue).

Route description

SR 169 begins in western Knox County a few miles south of Karns at an intersection with SR 131 (Lovell Road/Ball Camp-Byington Road). It goes east through suburban areas to have an intersection with Cedar Bluff Road, which leads south to an interchange with I-40/I-75 (Exit 378). It continues east through Suburban areas, where it enters Knoxville and has intersections with Gallaher View Road and Weisgarber Road before passing through industrial areas, where the median widens to the point that there are businesses inside of the median. The 2 halves of the roadway rejoin each other shortly before having an intersection with Ed Shouse Road, which leads to I-640/I-75 (Exit 1). SR 169 continues east to cross an overpass over I-640/I-75 before continuing east through industrial areas and passing under I-40. The highway then passes through a business district before coming to an end at an intersection with SR 62 (Western Avenue), just east of downtown.

It is known as Middlebrook Pike for its entire length. Although SR 169 passes over I-640/I-75 and under I-40, there are no direct exits with either interstate highway.

After a section from Cedar Bluff Road to SR 131 (Lovell Road) was completed in 2007, the entire length is now four lanes. The majority of the roadway is a median divided highway.

Major intersections

See also
 
 
 List of state routes in Tennessee

References

Tennessee Department of Transportation (24 January 2003). "State Highway and Interstate List 2003".

External links
Tennessee Department of Transportation

169
Transportation in Knox County, Tennessee
Transportation in Knoxville, Tennessee